"Blaze" is Kotoko's eleventh maxi single produced by I've Sound under the Geneon Entertainment label. The single was released on March 12, 2008. The title track was used as the second introductory theme for the anime series Shakugan no Shana Second, starting with episode 16 which was broadcast on January 31, 2008. The B-side, "Sociometry", was used as the ending theme for Shakugan no Shana Second. This is Kotoko's second tie-in with the anime series after her "Being" single.

The CD's catalog number is GNCV-0002 (for the regular edition) and GNCV-0001 (for the special edition, which adds a DVD containing the promotional video of the title track).

Track listing 
"Blaze"—5:06
Composition: Kazuya Takase
Arrangement: Kazuya Takase
Lyrics: Kotoko
"Sociometry"—4:47
Composition: C.G mix
Arrangement: C.G mix
Lyrics: Kotoko
"BLAZE" (instrumental) -- 5:06
"Sociometry" (instrumental) -- 4:44

Charts and sales

References

2008 singles
2008 songs
Kotoko (singer) songs
Shakugan no Shana songs
Song recordings produced by I've Sound
Songs with lyrics by Kotoko (musician)